Safe trade is a slogan advocated by Greenpeace in its desire to "green" the World Trade Organization and the Doha Development Round.  It is designed to compete with "free trade" as a concept.

Safe trade is generally seen as a single framework of rules worldwide to drastically inhibit the flow of alien organisms (e.g. Genetically modified organisms, imported animals) across the borders of ecoregions, to preserve their natural wild biodiversity.  It seeks to prevent ecological disasters caused by imported organisms or untested genetic technologies, and to augment and increase local natural capital by encouraging soil remediation, precision agriculture, and local consumption of the native species, rather than imported organisms and heavy use of pesticides.

Proposal
An important achievement of safe trade advocacy is the Biosafety Protocol agreed in Montreal in January 2000.  Although it relied on the weaker legal principle of Informed Consent and not the much stronger Precautionary Principle language sought by advocates, the protocol was considered by most to be a victory that could enhance both biosafety and biosecurity.

Other safe trade reforms seek to advance sustainability by reducing reliance on energy subsidies and oil-based transport, and (indirectly) improves equity in economic affairs - that is, it promotes a safer political economy which is more respectful of life in general.

Safe trade is a major goal of systems of Bioregional democracy and is often advocated alongside it, e.g. by Greens.  Both are also implicitly related to Community-Based Economics, as local trade in local goods with no reliance on alien organisms presents no ecological risk to its genomes, soil, or drainage basins.  Accordingly, some advocates argue, local trade in any native species within an ecoregion's borders should not be taxed at all, as it presents little or no ecological risk compared to imported goods, and so requires little or no regulation, labelling, inspection, or other expenses.

The assumption that imports carry moral hazards, and that tax, trade, tariff measures should compensate for harms done, is shared by advocates of fair trade whose programs address, in addition, more overt social justice concerns of human beings, such as the maintenance of the "human capital" of a region.  Both initiatives are alternatives to free trade, which has no such controls, and generally permits and encourages free transit in goods (but not, in general, labour) across ecological and social borders.

A broader understanding of biosecurity that is emerging under threat of biological warfare, and the fear that such economically devastating events as the mad cow disease epidemic could recur, either deliberately (as an act of bioterrorism) or by accident due to unrestricted imports, is causing some nations, notably New Zealand, to adopt relatively harsh restrictions against imported organisms.  As one objective of asymmetric warfare is to cause attacks to appear initially as accidents, or blame slow responses on apparently incompetent governments, there is some concern that spreading a virulent organism among animals would be an effective way to attack humans, damage economies, and discredit governments who are lax on biosecurity.  Technologies for scanning for dangerous organisms at ports and markets are also becoming more reliable and less expensive.  However, no bio-defense solution seems to be able to compete with a simple reduction of import volumes, and its corresponding reduction in risk of any accidents.

Reception

Opposition
Critics of safe trade argue that the military and agriculture aspects of biosecurity are dissimilar, unlikely to converge in the form of an attack disguised as an accident, and require such differential prevention and response measures that there is little risk reduced in altering the fundamental structure of trade relationships to accommodate a robust regime of biosecurity.  Such critics usually argue instead that emergency services' biodefense measures are sufficient to handle outbreaks of any diseases or alien organisms, and that such outbreaks are unlikely to be long sustained or deliberately masked as agricultural accidents.  This, to the advocates, seems like wishful thinking.

Support
Advocates point to the costs of emergency measures such as burning over one million cows suspected of having foot-and-mouth disease in the UK, smoke from which they calculated (based on dioxin levels) was to be expected to kill several hundred Britons from cancers in this generation.  Safe trade, they argue, would have removed the need for any such measures, as vaccination of British beef cattle would have been possible (the burning was to prevent British exports of beef from being rejected by its trade partners, who would not have been able to tell vaccinated from infected beef), and the foot-and-mouth disease was not so dangerous to humans that it could have justified dooming so many fellow citizens to die of the dioxin-caused cancers.  The burning, they argue, was justified only by bad trade rules that spread infection and advise dangerous cures that are worse than the ailment itself.

Another argument supporting safe trade rules is that there are links between primate extinction and deforestation in the regions where primates are abundant, i.e. the Amazon rainforest, African rainforest, and Sumatran rainforest.  Fail to prevent devastating logging in these regions, advocates claim, and a Great Ape species will likely become extinct, causing a critical link to the human past to be permanently lost.  Accordingly, preventing logs from these forests from reaching foreign markets has been a major focus of Greenpeace actions, especially in 2002.

See also
fair trade
biosafety
biosecurity
biodiversity

External links

 "Safe Trade in the 21st Century", Greenpeace, Center for Environmental Law

International trade
Environmental economics